The 2018–19 Biathlon World Cup – Sprint Women started on 8 December 2018 in Pokljuka and finished on 21 March 2019 in Oslo. It was won by the defending titlist, Anastasiya Kuzmina of Slovakia.

Competition format
The  sprint race is the third oldest biathlon event; the distance is skied over three laps. The biathlete shoots two times at any shooting lane, first prone, then standing, totalling 10 targets. Competitors' starts are staggered, normally by 30 seconds.

2017–18 Top 3 standings

Medal winners

Standings

References

Sprint Women